The women's mass start race of the 2014–15 ISU Speed Skating World Cup 5, arranged in the Vikingskipet arena in Hamar, Norway, was held on 1 February 2015.

Irene Schouten of the Netherlands won the race, while Ivanie Blondin of Canada came second, and Mariska Huisman of the Netherlands came third.

Results
The race took place on Saturday, 1 February, scheduled in the afternoon session, at 15:09.

References

Women mass start
5